Wei Wei (born 28 September 1965) is a Chinese mandopop singer, philanthropist, and current Standing Committee Member of the Chinese Peasants' and Workers' Democratic Party since 2010. She previously served as Standing Committee Member of the All-China Youth Federation from 2005 to 2010, as China's Forestry Ambassador to the United Nations of the National Forestry and Grassland Administration from 2009 to 2010, and as Ambassador of the Chinese Football Association from 2008 to 2009. In 2022, she was appointed Visiting Professor of Music and a doctoral advisor specializing in vocal music at Shinawatra University, a private international university in Thailand established by former Prime Minister of Thailand, Thaksin Shinawatra.

Her breakthrough came in 1986 when she won the National Young Singers contest on Chinese television and The 24th Sopot International Song Festival in Poland, when she also won the "Miss Photo Category", and four years later, she was chosen to perform at the 11th Asian Games in Beijing, singing a duet with Spanish singer Julio Iglesias at the 1993 East Asian Games in Shanghai.

Largely associated with sports and the Olympics, Wei has been an Olympic Ambassador for China since 1993 when the Chinese Olympic Committee applied for the games for the first time. She supported the Beijing 2008 Summer Olympics by performing at major Olympic events in China and abroad, and in an internet survey conducted in 2004 regarding who should sing the theme song of the Chinese Olympics, she received the most votes. She was the only representative for Asia at the 100 Year Anniversary Show for the Olympic Games in Atlanta, USA in 1996, and has previously performed at the opening ceremony of the Shanghai World Expo, the closing ceremony of the Beijing 2008 Summer Olympics, and at the opening and closing ceremonies of the 11th National Games in Nanjing, China. Her songs have become the official theme songs for major Chinese sporting events, such as in 2006 when her single I Want to Fly was appointed as the official theme song for the 2008 Olympic Sailing events held in Qingdao by the Chinese Olympic Committee and the Sailing Committee of Qingdao, and in 2007, she was named the "Queen of Sports" by the All-China Women's Federation.

Early life
Wei was born to a Zhuang family in Hohhot, Inner Mongolia to Zhang Yu, a People's Liberation Army veteran and Wei Xiuqun. While in kindergarten, she began practicing the performing arts. When she was 7 years old, her family moved to Liuzhou in Guangxi, and at the age of 14, she moved to Beijing and started to work for the China National Song & Dance Ensemble. As a young unit member her education in the performing arts continued, and included dancing, singing, playing instruments, choreography, stage design, and lighting. The unit traveled all over the country, often doing several live performances in one day. She finished her education at the Central Conservatory of Music in Beijing, China.

Career

1986–1987: Breakthrough and National Qualification

In 1986, Wei won the National Young Singers contest on Chinese television with the song Wanna Take One More Chance to Look at You. In 1987, she won the 24th Sopot International Music Festival in Poland as China's first representative to an international pop competition. In 1986 at the age of she was awarded a "2nd Level National Performer Professional Qualification Certificate" by the Ministry of Culture of the People's Republic of China. A year after, the ministry awarded her with a "1st Level National Performer Professional Qualification Certificate", the highest professional qualification of her field in China, equal to a Professional Doctorate, and which enabled her to teach at professor level in music academies in China.

1988–1992: Dedication of Love and Rise to Stardom

In 1988, Wei sang the theme song for China Central Television's New Year's Gala, Gathering of the Year of the Dragon. In 1989, her rendition of the Chinese song Dedication of Love - a performance credited with truly starting her career– became a national hit in China, and she became a symbol for charity and fund-raising activities as her performance had raised enough funds to help a rural migrant worker from Anhui to recover from spinal surgery. In the same year, her song Today is Your Birthday won the Gold Medal at the Jian Brand Cup and Beijing Radio Song Competition, and has since been used as a theme song to celebrate China's National Day. In 1990, her new single Asian Mighty Winds was selected as the theme of the 1990 Asian Games, and she performed it alongside Chinese singer Liu Huan. The song quickly became another national hit, and Wei was dubbed the "Queen of Sports" by the Provincial Government of Guangxi, Liuzhou. That same year, she starred in the film The Story of A Songstress alongside Chinese actor Zhang Guoli, and performed at the Miss Asia Pageant show in Hong Kong in 1992,also becoming the lead singer in the first concert tour in American major cities arranged by the China Central Song and Dance Group.

1993–2000: Carnegie Hall and International Recognition

In 1993, Wei was the lead singer at the 1993 East Asian Games opening and closing ceremonies together with Spanish singer Julio Iglesias. She then performed her single Asian Mighty Winds again at the 1994 Asian Games opening show in Hiroshima, Japan, and the lyrics of her songs became the subject of academic discourse and analysis in Japan. Later that year, she represented the People's Republic of China visited Monaco to campaign for the Beijing Summer Olympic Games, and a year after, in 1994, she was named Star of the Night after her performance of her hit single Dedication of Love at the CCTV New Year's Gala in Carnegie Hall, New York. In the same year, the song Wind Coming From the East became a hit at a show in Shanghai Oriental TV, and subsequently became the TV station's theme song. Her first English album was released, titled The Twilight.

In the year after her performance at Carnegie Hall, she started her concert tour "Wei Wei and the World", which included visits and performances in the major cities in Mainland China, including Beijing, Shanghai, Guangzhou, and Kunming. She represented Asia and performed in front of 60,000 people at the centennial anniversary of the Olympic Games in Atlanta in 1996, and was portrayed in a CNN fifteen-minute special as the only Asian representative for the Olympic anniversary show. In 1999, Wei's compilation album Wei Wei's Devotion was the most popular pop music album in China, and she held a concert at Caesar's Palace in Paris, France to further promote the album. In 2000, she joined the Chinese Olympic Committee and represented the People's Republic of China in campaigning for the Beijing 2008 Summer Olympics, and performing with the Sydney Opera and Shanghai Opera. Her rendition of The Same Song won her a Golden Phoenix Prize at the 6th China Music Television Competition.

2000–2013: Go, Girl Go! and The 2008 Beijing Olympics

In 2003, Wei was invited as a special guest at galas arranged in Beijing in the honor of healthcare staff after the SARS epidemic, and initiated an international management company, Wei Wei International Management, in Stockholm for the purpose of further developing her international career. In 2004, she continued her performances for Olympic and sports related events, and inaugurated the construction start of the new Beijing National Stadium. During this time, she was also the main performer at the opening ceremony show for the Formula 1 Racetrack in Shanghai. At a show for the international unveiling of China's Olympic slogan "One World, One Dream", she performed Andrew Lloyd Webber's song Love Changes Everything.

In 2006, she celebrated twenty years on stage, highlighted by the release of twenty new recordings of her 20 greatest hits. The first one, a medley that consists of parts of her five greatest hits, was launched on 8 May: the 20X20 Dance Loop. She also released worldwide on digital download distributor iTunes Music Store, and commenced an international tour for the celebration of the Chinese New Year, which included performances in Los Angeles, Vienna, Barcelona, and Roger's Center in Toronto, where she was welcomed by China's Ambassador to Canada, Lu Shumin and Consulate General of Toronto Chen Xiaoling. During this time, she also served as a judge on China's largest singing competition, The National Young Singers Grand Awards, and performed the Olympic theme song One World, One Dream at an Olympic Show at the Great Wall together with Olympic athletes.

In 2007, she was appointed Ambassador for the Chinese Football Association, and her single Go, Girl Go! was appointed the official theme song of the 2007 FIFA Women's World Cup. FC Barcelona players Carles Puyol, Lionel Messi, Deco and others joined Wei in the Go, Girl Go! music video as a salute to women's football players.

In 2008, she performed as part of the Fairchild Media Group, and Shanghai Media Group's Chinese New Year All Star Show 2008. The show was filmed in Vancouver, British Columbia, Canada, on 18 January 2008, and included a duet from Wei and classical-crossover soprano Giorgia Fumanti. As the year drew to a close, she collaborated with BoA, Ruth Sahanaya, Despina Vandi, Sonu, Daniela Mercury and others to remix her original hit song Dedication of Love in English.

At closing ceremony of the 2008 Summer Olympics held in Beijing, Wei performed Surpass alongside Chinese singer Sun Nan.

2014-2022: I Am A Singer and The 2022 Winter Olympics

In 2014, Wei competed in I Am a Singer (Chinese season 2) alongside Phil Chang, Gary Chaw,G.E.M., Han Lei and others. 

In 2022, she reappeared after a 8 year hiatus as one of the lead singers for the 2022 Winter Olympics' theme song "Together for the Future". On February 18 2022, Wei's online encouragement of her eldest son Symington to "learn from" Olympic skier Eileen Gu became a trending topic on Weibo and made headlines in the Chinese press. The same year, she was appointed Visiting Professor of Music and a doctoral advisor specializing in vocal music at Shinawatra University, a private international university in Thailand established by former Prime Minister of Thailand, Thaksin Shinawatra.

Charity work 
Throughout her career, Wei has performed at a variety of charity shows. In 1991, she performed her song Dedication of Love at a charity fundraising show in China for victims of the 1998 China floods at the Great Hall of the People in Beijing. In 2004 she performed Dedication of Love together with Yang Haito, a blind Chinese artist, at a charity ball for the handicapped hosted by Deng Pufang, son of the former Chinese leader Deng Xiaoping. In 2005 she performed at the charity show "The Happiness Project" for mothers in Shenzhen, China.

In 2012, she attended a charity auction in Beijing alongside her three children to auction the dress she wore during her performance at the 2008 Beijing Olympics. It sold for a record CNY ¥300,000 (US$42,800), and all proceeds were donated to charity. In 2013, to raise funds for cancer research and to spread awareness for cancer patients, she performed Dedication of Love at the 15th Beijing Hope Run & Dash held in Chaoyang Park, Beijing to an audience of over 5585 people, for which she was awarded a world record for "the most number of people who sang Dedication of Love using sign language at the same time in the world" by the World Record Association of Hong Kong.

Personal life 
Wei married American composer Michael Joseph Smith in 1995, and the couple had three children, Symington W. Smith, Remington W. Smith & Vinson W. Smith. They divorced in 2005, and she moved with her children from Stockholm, Sweden to Beijing, China.

Wei has been a long-time friend of Hong Kong actor Jackie Chan, who appeared with her and her children at a charity event in Beijing, and Chinese-Singaporean actress Gong Li, who in pictures released by Xinhua News Agency in 2014 showed Gong embracing Wei's eldest son, Symington, at Wei's home in Beijing.

In December 2009, Swedish tax authorities accused Wei of owing an estimated SEK 80–104 million Swedish kronor (approximately US$10 million) in taxes to the Swedish government for incomes earned in China during the years 2003–2008. In response, she released a public letter addressed to then-Prime Minister of Sweden, Fredrik Reinfeld, asking for help and arguing that the tax authorities had illegally confiscated her assets because the tax authorities had proceeded with confiscation without a warrant or court order. The Swedish tax authority's accusations were ultimately rejected by Swedish courts due to a lack of concrete facts.

Legacy
Wei is largely considered a national treasure in China, and one of its most iconic singers. Wei is the first Mainland Chinese pop singer after the reform and opening-up period initiated under Deng Xiaoping to have competed abroad officially representing the People's Republic of China, the first Zhuang ethnic minority artist to represent China internationally, the first woman to be selected as China's Olympic Ambassador, and one of China's earliest artists to use the internet for the digital release of music. In 2015, she was awarded an honorary doctorate from the East China University of Political Science and Law and appointed Honorary Dean, and she holds a world record for the largest number of people to perform a sing-along using sign language. She has sold an estimated 200 million records, making her one of the best-selling Mainland Chinese artist during the 1990s, and leading her to be referred to as "China's Whitney Houston", and "China's Madonna".

Discography

References 

1963 births
Living people
English-language singers from China
People from Hohhot
Chinese Mandopop singers
Zhuang people
Singers from Inner Mongolia
20th-century Chinese women singers
21st-century Chinese women singers